The 2021 FC Akzhayik season was Akzhayik's 1st season back in the Kazakhstan Premier League, the highest tier of association football in Kazakhstan, following their relegation from the league in 2018.

Season events
On 19 February, Akzhayik announced the signing of Miram Sapanov from Zhetysu, and Yerkin Tapalov from Shakhter Karagandy.

The following day, 20 February, Akzhayik announced the signings of Pavel Nazarenko from Vitebsk, Sergey Shustikov from Torpedo Moscow, Soslan Takulov from Shakhter Karagandy, Yevgeni Yatskiy from Akron Tolyatti, Oleksiy Chychykov from Dnipro-1, and Marat Burayev. Whilst Serhiy Litovchenko signed for the club on 21 February.

On 27 February, Akzhayik announced the signing of Nauryzbek Zhagorov from Ekibastuz.

On 2 March Magomed Paragulgov joined Akzhayik from Ermis Aradippou, Yevgeni Kozlov joined from Ventspils, Vyacheslav Shvyrev on loan from Kairat, and Dmitri Michurenkov from Nizhny Novgorod.

On 4 March, Akzhayik announced the signings of Artem Baranovskyi and Mykola Kovtalyuk.

On 1 July, Akzhayik announced the signings of Ștefan Sicaci, Mikhail Gashchenkov and Luka Imnadze.

On 23 August, Akzhayik announced the signing of Reginaldo from Shkupi.

Squad

Out on loan

Transfers

In

Loans in

Out

Released

Friendlies

Competitions

Overview

Premier League

Results summary

Results by round

Results

League table

Kazakhstan Cup

Group stage

Squad statistics

Appearances and goals

|-
|colspan="16"|Players away from Akzhayik on loan:
|-
|colspan="16"|Players who left Akzhayik during the season:

|}

Goal scorers

Clean sheets

Disciplinary record

References

FC Akzhayik seasons
Akzhayik